Patrick Gordon Campbell, 3rd Baron Glenavy (6 June 1913 – 10 November 1980) was an Irish journalist, humorist and television personality.

Life and career
Campbell was born in Dublin, the first son of Charles Campbell, 2nd Baron Glenavy and Beatrice, Lady Glenavy (the artist Beatrice Elvery).  He was educated at Rossall School (which he loathed) and then Pembroke College, Oxford, but left Oxford without completing his degree. He was taken on by The Irish Times by Robert Smyllie and reported on "Courts Day by Day". During the Second World War, he served as a Chief Petty Officer in the Irish Marine Service. After the war he re-joined The Irish Times (using the pseudonym 'Quidnunc'), and given charge of the column "Irishman's Diary". He had a weekly column for the Irish edition of the Sunday Dispatch before working on the paper in London from 1947 to 1949. He was assistant editor of Lilliput from 1947 to 1953. His writings also appeared in The Sunday Times.

His books, mostly collections of humorous pieces that were originally published in newspapers and magazines, included: A Long Drink of Cold Water (1949), A Short Trot with a Cultured Mind (1950), An Irishman's Diary (1950), Life in Thin Slices (1951), Patrick Campbell's Omnibus (1954), Come Here Till I Tell You (1960), Constantly in Pursuit (1962), How to Become a Scratch Golfer (1963), Brewing Up in the Basement (1963), Rough Husbandry (1965), The P-P-Penguin Patrick Campbell (1965), All Ways on Sundays (1966), A Bunch of New Roses (1967), an autobiography My Life and Easy Times (1967), The Coarse of Events (1968), Gullible Travels (1969), The High Speed Gasworks (1970), Waving All Excuses (1971), Patrick Campbell's Golfing Book (1972), Fat Tuesday Tails (1972), 35 Years on the Job (1973), and The Campbell Companion (1987). Many of his books were illustrated by Quentin Blake.

Campbell was married three times, first in 1941 to Sylvia Alfreda Willoughby Lee, whom he divorced in 1947. Then to Chery Louise Munro in 1947.  The two divorced in 1966, the year he married Vivienne Orme.

Campbell spoke with a stammer, but nevertheless delighted television audiences with his wit, notably as a regular team captain on the long-running show Call My Bluff, opposite his longtime friend, Frank Muir.  Muir noted that "When he was locked solid by a troublesome initial letter he would show his frustration by banging his knee and muttering 'Come along! Come along!'".  Some of his funniest short stories described incidents involving his stammer. Campbell stood six feet five inches tall, and several of his funniest pieces dealt with the problems faced by a man of his build in merely finding shoes or clothes that fitted him.                                                                                                  He also made regular appearances in That Was The Week That Was.

He lived for many years in the South of France, and died in Cannes on 10 November 1980. He was succeeded as the 4th and last Lord Glenavy by his novelist brother Michael.

References

External links

List of pieces written by Campbell for Lilliput magazine between 1947 and 1960.

1913 births
1980 deaths
Barons in the Peerage of the United Kingdom
Irish magazine editors
People educated at Rossall School
Comedians from Dublin (city)
The Irish Times people